Robert Bowlby Blake (born December 10, 1969) is a Canadian professional ice hockey executive and former player. He is the current general manager of the Los Angeles Kings of the National Hockey League (NHL). He was originally drafted by the Kings in 1988, appearing in the 1993 Stanley Cup Finals, winning the James Norris Memorial Trophy and serving as team captain for five seasons in his initial 11-season stint with the club. In 2001, Blake was traded to the Colorado Avalanche and was a member of their 2001 Stanley Cup championship team. It was his only Stanley Cup as a player, though he won the Cup again as a member of the Kings' front office in 2014. After a two-season return to Los Angeles, Blake signed with the San Jose Sharks in 2008, retiring as its captain after the 2009–10 season. Four years later, in 2014, Blake was elected into the Hockey Hall of Fame.

Internationally, Blake played for Canada in three consecutive Winter Olympics in 1998, 2002 and 2006, winning gold in 2002 and becoming the 11th member of the Triple Gold Club.

Playing career

Los Angeles Kings (1990–2001)
Blake was selected 70th overall in the 1988 NHL Entry Draft by the Los Angeles Kings. He had completed his freshman year with Bowling Green State University of the Central Collegiate Hockey Association (CCHA) when he was drafted and went on to play three years total in the college ranks, earning CCHA and NCAA West first All-Star team honours in 1990. Blake was also the first player to ever receive the CCHA Best Offensive Defenseman award. Foregoing his final season of college eligibility, Blake joined the Kings for the final four games of the 1989–90 season before scoring 46 points in his NHL rookie campaign in 1990–91 to be named to the NHL All-Rookie Team.

After a 59-point campaign in his third season, Blake helped lead the Kings to the 1993 Stanley Cup Finals, where they were defeated in five games by the Montreal Canadiens. The following season, in 1993–94, Blake improved to a career-high 48 assists and 68 points, but the Kings failed to qualify for the playoffs.

In a season where Blake was kept to just six games due to injury, the Kings traded captain Wayne Gretzky to the St. Louis Blues at the 1995–96 trade deadline, leaving the team's captaincy vacant. Blake was named the 11th captain in team history. He served as captain from 1996 to 2001. In 1997–98, Blake received the James Norris Memorial Trophy as the NHL's best defenceman after recording a career-high 23 goals to go with 50 points.

On February 21, 2001, with Blake about to become an unrestricted free agent in the 2001 off-season, the Kings traded him (along with Steven Reinprecht) to the Colorado Avalanche in exchange for Adam Deadmarsh, Aaron Miller, Jared Aulin and a first-round pick (used to select Dave Steckel).

Colorado Avalanche (2001–2006)
After 11 seasons in Los Angeles, Blake joined Colorado late in the 2000–01 season and made an immediate impact, scoring 10 points in the final 13 games of the regular season after being traded. In the 2001 playoffs, he played a second-round series against his former club, the Kings, before he won his first and only Stanley Cup with the Avalanche, adding 19 points in 23 playoff games. In totalling 59 points in 67 games in the regular season, Blake was selected to the NHL second All-Star team.

On July 1, 2001, Blake re-signed with the Avalanche in the off-season to a five-year contract with an optional sixth year. As the Avalanche's top defenceman, Blake recorded his highest total with the Avalanche in recording 56 points in 75 games, third amongst NHL defenceman, in the 2001–02 season, before falling in their defence of the Stanley Cup in the Western Conference finals to the Detroit Red Wings. For his third successive season, Blake was selected to the NHL second All-Star team.

In the following 2002–03 season, Blake recorded his 500th career point against the Minnesota Wild on October 29, 2002. In finishing fifth in Norris Trophy voting, Blake placed second amongst Avalanche defenceman with 45 points in 79 games. In each of his first three seasons with the Avalanche, he was selected to the NHL All-Star Game, and in the 2003–04 campaign, he was selected as a starter for the 2004 All-Star Game in Saint Paul, Minnesota. He finished the season with the Avalanche, placing ninth in the NHL amongst defenceman with 46 points.

After losing a season to the 2004–05 NHL lockout, Blake returned for his final season under contract with the Avalanche in 2005–06. He continued his scoring presence amongst the Avalanche in recording 51 points in 81 games, the seventh time in his career he surpassed the 50-point plateau. On April 3, 2006, against the Chicago Blackhawks, he scored his 200th career NHL goal to become just the 17th defenceman all-time to reach the mark.

Return to Los Angeles (2006–2008)
After five years with Colorado, the Avalanche chose not to pick up his contract option for the 2006–07 season, making him a free agent. On July 1, 2006, he re-signed with his former team, the Los Angeles Kings, for two years at $6 million per year.

Having come off a 51-point campaign with Colorado the previous year, Blake's production dipped upon his return to Los Angeles. He recorded 34 points in 2006–07 for his lowest total since 1996–97. Nevertheless, prior to the start of the 2007–08 season, Blake was renamed team captain on September 28, 2007, after previous captain Mattias Norström's departure to the Dallas Stars.

San Jose Sharks (2008–2010)

Becoming an unrestricted free agent once more in the 2008 off-season, on July 3, 2008, Blake signed a one-year, US$5 million contract with the Kings' Pacific Division rival San Jose Sharks. Blake reached the 40-point plateau once more with the Sharks, tallying 10 goals and 35 assists in his first season in San Jose.

Blake extended his contract with the Sharks, re-signing for another year at $3.5 million to avoid free agency. Blake would be named captain of the Sharks approximately six weeks after previous captain Patrick Marleau was stripped of the role by Sharks management.

Retirement
On June 18, 2010, Blake announced his final retirement from professional hockey. On March 3, 2011, during a Los Angeles Kings telecast, Blake discussed his post-playing career as a hockey operations manager for the NHL, based in Toronto. Blake said, "This job kind of developed over the summer (of 2010) in talking with Brendan Shanahan. I played for a while in the NHL (20 years). As a former player, I can provide the league with some insight in various aspects of the game. I was able to stay on the West Coast (and commute to Toronto for work), so it worked out really well." {interview by LA Kings telecasters during broadcast 3/3/11} He continued, "I watch the game much differently now, just because I've been in Toronto, in the war room. Now, I watch the game and see the calls that are made as well as the ones which weren't but should have been." {interview by LA Kings telecasters during broadcast 3/3/11}

On August 11, 2014, the Los Angeles Kings announced they would be retiring Blake's number 4 jersey on January 17, 2015. He was later selected to the Colorado Avalanche's 20th anniversary team honoured on December 8, 2015.

Executive career
Before the 2013–14 season, the Los Angeles Kings hired Blake as assistant general manager. The Kings won the Stanley Cup in his first year. As the assistant general manager to the Kings, he also acted as the general manager for their American Hockey League (AHL) affiliates, the Manchester Monarchs (2013–2015) and the Ontario Reign (2015–).

Blake was also selected by Hockey Canada to be their general manager for the 2014 IIHF World Championship.

On April 10, 2017, the Kings named Blake the vice-president and general manager of the team.

Personal life
Blake and his wife Brandy have three children, sons Jack and Max, and daughter Brooke. His best friend is former NHL goaltender Dwayne Roloson, with whom he grew up playing hockey in Simcoe, Ontario. He is also distantly related to Hall of Famer Red Kelly. In 2008, Blake appeared in the Mike Myers film The Love Guru as himself. A short street in his hometown of Simcoe, Rob Blake Way, is named after him.

Career statistics

Regular season and playoffs

International

Awards and honours

See also
List of NHL players with 1000 games played

References

External links
 
 
 
 
 

1969 births
Living people
Bowling Green Falcons men's ice hockey players
Canadian ice hockey defencemen
Colorado Avalanche players
Hockey Hall of Fame inductees
Ice hockey people from Ontario
Ice hockey players at the 1998 Winter Olympics
Ice hockey players at the 2002 Winter Olympics
Ice hockey players at the 2006 Winter Olympics
IIHF Hall of Fame inductees
James Norris Memorial Trophy winners
Los Angeles Kings draft picks
Los Angeles Kings executives
Los Angeles Kings players
Medalists at the 2002 Winter Olympics
National Hockey League All-Stars
Olympic gold medalists for Canada
Olympic ice hockey players of Canada
Olympic medalists in ice hockey
San Jose Sharks players
Simcoe Composite School alumni
Sportspeople from Norfolk County, Ontario
Stanley Cup champions
Triple Gold Club
AHCA Division I men's ice hockey All-Americans
Canadian expatriate ice hockey players in the United States